After the Rain is the sixth album by R&B group Side Effect. Released in 1980, it was their first album for Elektra Records as well as Miki Howard's first appearance as vocalist.

Critical reception 
In a review issued on May 3, 1980, a Billboard praised the variety of musical material of the album and compared it with Rufus & Chaka. Cover of Toto's "Georgy Porgy" has been described as "soulful".

Track listing 
 Take a Chance 'N' Dance – 5:17 	
 The Thrill Is Gone – 3:07 	
 Georgy Porgy – 4:52 	
 Close to Me – 3:31 	
 I Feel It's Real – 2:42 	
 Black Beauty – 4:36 	
 Pretty Baby – 1:22 	
 Catch It 'Fore It Falls – 3:36 	
 Eleanor Rigby – 4:03 	
 Superwoman – 5:53

Charts

Singles

References

External links 
 Side Effect-After The Rain at Discogs

1980 albums
Side Effect albums
Elektra Records albums
Albums produced by Wayne Henderson (musician)